Thomas Alfred Harris (8 November 1924 – 11 October 2001) was an English footballer who played in the Football League as a forward for Leyton Orient and Colchester United.

Career

Born in Chelsea, London, Harris began his career with local club Fulham, but after failing to break into the team joined Leyton Orient in 1951. He scored 11 goals in 31 league appearances for Orient before signing for Colchester United in 1953. He made his debut for the club on 10 October 1953 in a 3–0 home defeat by Coventry City. He played a further two games for Colchester with his final appearance coming on 5 December in a 1–0 victory over his former club Leyton Orient.

Harris left Colchester, later playing for Tonbridge Angels, Yiewsley and Deal Town in the non-leagues. He died on 11 October 2001 aged 76.

References

1924 births
2001 deaths
Footballers from Chelsea, London
English footballers
Association football forwards
Fulham F.C. players
Leyton Orient F.C. players
Colchester United F.C. players
Tonbridge Angels F.C. players
Hillingdon Borough F.C. players
Deal Town F.C. players
English Football League players